Children's Discovery Museum station is an at-grade light rail station on the Blue Line of the VTA light rail system. The station platform runs along Woz Way (named after Apple founder Steve "Woz" Wozniak) and serves the Children's Discovery Museum of San Jose, after which the station is named. Just south of this station, the Blue Line enters the median of California State Route 87.

Service

Station layout

Notable places nearby 
The station is within walking distance of the following notable places:
Children's Discovery Museum of San Jose
Guadalupe River Trail

References

External links 

Santa Clara Valley Transportation Authority light rail stations
Santa Clara Valley Transportation Authority bus stations
Railway stations in San Jose, California
Railway stations in the United States opened in 1987
1987 establishments in California